The Brown Bunny is a 2003 experimental road drama film written, directed, produced, photographed and edited by Vincent Gallo. Starring Gallo and Chloë Sevigny, it tells the story of a motorcycle racer on a cross-country drive who is haunted by memories of his former lover. It was photographed with handheld 16 mm cameras in various locations throughout the United States, including New Hampshire, Massachusetts, Ohio, Missouri, Utah, Nevada, and California. Following a world premiere at the 2003 Cannes Film Festival, the film garnered a great deal of media attention because of an explicit scene where Sevigny performs unsimulated fellatio on Gallo, as well as a feud between Gallo and the film critic Roger Ebert, who stated that The Brown Bunny was the worst film in the history of Cannes, although he later gave a re-edited version his signature "thumbs up".

Plot
Motorcycle racer Bud Clay undertakes a cross-country drive, following a race in New Hampshire, in order to participate in a race in California. All the while he is haunted by memories of his former lover, Daisy. On his journey he meets three women, but Bud seems to be a lost soul, and he is unable to form an emotional connection with any of them. He first meets Violet at a gas station in New Hampshire and convinces her to join him on his trip. They stop at her home in order to get her clothes, but he drives off as soon as she enters the house.

Bud's next stop is the home of Daisy's parents, the location of Daisy's brown bunny. Daisy's mother does not remember Bud, who grew up in the house next door, nor does she remember having visited Bud and Daisy in California. Next, Bud stops at a pet shelter, where he asks about the life expectancy of rabbits (he is told it is about five or six years). At a highway rest stop, he meets a distressed woman, Lilly. He comforts and kisses her, before starting to cry and eventually leaving her. Bud appears more distressed as the road trip continues, crying as he drives. He stops at the Bonneville Speedway to race his motorcycle. In Las Vegas, he drives around prostitutes on street corners, before deciding to ask one of them, Rose, to join him for a lunch. She eats McDonald's food in his truck until he stops, pays her, and leaves her back on the street.

After having his motorcycle checked in a Los Angeles garage, Bud stops at Daisy's house, which appears abandoned. He leaves a note on the door frame, after sitting in his truck in the driveway remembering about kissing Daisy in this place, and checks in at a hotel. Daisy eventually appears there. She seems nervous, going to the bathroom twice to smoke crack cocaine, while Bud waits for her, sitting on his bed. As she proposes to go out to buy something to drink, Bud tells her that, because of what happened the last time they saw each other, he does not drink anymore.

They have an argument about Daisy kissing other men. At this point, Bud undresses Daisy and she fellates him. Once done, he insults her as they lie in bed, talking about what happened during their last meeting. Bud continuously asks Daisy why she had been involved with some men at a party. She explains that she was just being friendly and wanted to smoke marijuana with them. Bud becomes upset because Daisy was pregnant and it transpires that the baby died as a result of what happened at this party.

Through flashback scenes, the viewer understands that Daisy was raped at the party, a scene witnessed by Bud, who did not intervene. Daisy asks Bud why he did not help her, and his feelings of guilt on this are considerable. He tells her that he did not know what to do, and so he decided to leave the party. After he came back a bit later, he saw an ambulance in front of the house and Daisy explains to Bud that she is dead, having passed out prior to the rape and then choked to death on her own vomit. Bud awakens the next morning, alone; his encounter with Daisy turns out to have been a figment of his imagination. The movie ends as Bud is driving his truck in California.

Cast
 Vincent Gallo as Bud Clay
 Chloë Sevigny as Daisy
 Cheryl Tiegs as Lilly
 Elizabeth Blake as Rose
 Anna Vareschi as Violet
 Mary Morasky as Mrs. Lemon

Production and release
The film was shot in 16 mm and then blown up in 35 mm, which gives the photography a typical "old-school grain". Vincent Gallo credited himself as director of the photography as well as one of the three camera operators along with Toshiaki Ozawa and John Clemens.

The version of the film shown in the U.S. has been cut by about 25 minutes compared to the version shown at Cannes, removing a large part of the initial scene at the race track (about four minutes shorter), about six minutes of music and black screen at the end of the film, and about seven minutes of driving before the scene in the Bonneville Speedway.

Neither Anna Vareschi nor Elizabeth Blake, both in the film, were professional actresses. Kirsten Dunst and Winona Ryder were both attached to the project but left. In an interview from The Guardian Sevigny said of the sex scene: "It was tough, the toughest thing I've ever done, but Vincent was very sensitized to my needs, very gentle. . . . And we'd been intimate in the past." Actress Jennifer Jason Leigh was initially set to play the role that Sevigny played, including the unsimulated oral sex scene, but ultimately turned the role down due to being in a relationship at the time.

For the film's promotion, a trailer was released featuring a split screen in the style of Andy Warhol's Chelsea Girls, depicting on one side of the screen a single point-of-view-shot of a driver on a country road, and the other side various scenes from the end of the film featuring Chloë Sevigny. Neither side of the screen had any audio tracks attached, although the song "Milk and Honey" by folk singer Jackson C. Frank played over the trailer's duration.

Themes
Gallo, a political conservative and teetotaler, has stated that he views The Brown Bunny as "a celebration of America that is virulently anti-drug and anti-pornography." Randy Kennedy of The New York Times wrote that the film's "sex scene does seem like the antithesis of pornography. The camera and microphones are so close to the characters that the familiar sense of voyeuristic distance is impossible to maintain."

Controversy

Cannes reception and reviews
The film was entered into the 2003 Cannes Film Festival. It was reportedly heckled, with the crowd jeering every time Gallo's name appeared during the credits. Seiichi Tsukada, an executive at Kinetique, the Japanese company that provided the financing for The Brown Bunny, said “I was at Cannes. I felt injustice. The bashing in Cannes is not for Brown Bunny. I think they’re bashing Vincent. I don’t know why.”

Upon his return to the US, Gallo took a defiant stance, defending the film and finishing a new edit that clarified and tightened the storyline. A war of words then erupted between Gallo and film critic Roger Ebert, with Ebert writing that The Brown Bunny was the worst film in the history of Cannes, and Gallo retorting by calling Ebert a "fat pig with the physique of a slave trader." Paraphrasing a statement attributed to Winston Churchill, Ebert responded with, "It is true that I am fat, but one day I will be thin, and he will still be the director of The Brown Bunny." Gallo then claimed to have put a hex on Ebert's colon, cursing the critic with cancer. In response, Ebert quipped that watching a video of his colonoscopy had been more entertaining than watching The Brown Bunny. Gallo subsequently stated that the hex had actually been placed on Ebert's prostate and that he had intended the comment to be a joke which was mistakenly taken seriously by a journalist. He also conceded to finding Ebert's colonoscopy comment to be an amusing comeback.

A shorter, re-edited version of the film played later in 2003 at the Toronto International Film Festival (although it still retained the controversial sex scene). The new version was regarded more highly by some, even Ebert, who gave the new cut three stars out of a possible four. On the August 28, 2004 episode of the television show Ebert & Roeper, Ebert gave the new version of the film a "thumbs up" rating. In a column published about the same time, Ebert reported that he and Gallo had made peace. According to Ebert:

In 2018 (five years after Ebert's death), however, Gallo rebuked Ebert's statement, calling it "both far-fetched and an outright lie." According to Gallo, "If you didn’t like the unfinished film at Cannes, you didn’t like the finished film, and vice versa." Gallo went on to speculate that Ebert wanted to distance himself from "a brutal, dismissive review of a film that other, more serious critics eventually felt differently about." In addition, Gallo incorrectly stated that the film's final cut was only eight minutes shorter than the Cannes cut, not 26 minutes shorter as Ebert had claimed.

Nevertheless, The Brown Bunny still received mixed reviews from other critics and has a rating of 47% on Rotten Tomatoes based on 96 reviews with an average score of 5.3/10. The website's critics consensus states "More dull than hypnotic, The Brown Bunny is a pretentious and self-indulgent bore." Metacritic gives the film a score of 51 out of 100 based on reviews from 30 critics.

French cinema magazine Les Cahiers du Cinéma voted The Brown Bunny one of the ten best films of 2004. The film won the FIPRESCI Prize at the Vienna International Film Festival for its "bold exploration of yearning and grief and for its radical departure from dominant tendencies in current American filmmaking". The film, aside from the feud with Roger Ebert, gained some positive reaction from American critics as well. Neva Chonin of the San Francisco Chronicle called it "a somber poem of a film sure to frustrate those who prefer resolution to ambiguity... like an inscrutably bad dream, [it] lingers on." The film was praised by other filmmakers including Jean-Luc Godard, John Waters, Sean Penn, and Werner Herzog who called it "the best portrayal of the particular loneliness a man feels."

The Daily Telegraph listed The Brown Bunny as one of the 100 "defining" films of the decade, calling it the decade's "most reviled" film, but saying it was "destined to become a future lost classic."

Sevigny's response
In August 2004 upon the film's limited theatrical release in the United States, star Sevigny took to defending the film and its final scene, stating, "It's a shame people write so many things when they haven't seen it. When you see the film, it makes more sense. It's an art film. It should be playing in museums. It's like an Andy Warhol movie.

Despite the negative backlash toward Sevigny's involvement in the film, some critics praised her decision. New York Times reviewer Manohla Dargis said: 

Seven years later, in an interview for Playboys January 2011 issue, Sevigny talked about the oral sex scene in the film: "What's happened with that is all very complicated. There are a lot of emotions. I'll probably have to go to therapy at some point. But I love Vincent. The film is tragic and beautiful, and I'm proud of it and my performance. I'm sad that people think one way of the movie, but what can you do? I've done many explicit sex scenes, but I'm not that interested in doing any more. I'm more self-aware now and wouldn't be able to be as free, so why even do it?"

Billboard promotion
The Brown Bunny also attracted media attention over a large billboard erected over Sunset Boulevard in West Hollywood, California in 2004 promoting the film. The billboard featured a black-and-white image taken from the fellatio sequence, drawing complaints from residents and business owners. The image showed Gallo standing with Sevigny on her knees, but did not show any explicit sexual content. It was eventually removed nonetheless. In 2011, a similar image featuring in the billboard of another French film, The Players (Les infidèles), triggered a similar controversy.

Soundtrack

The motion picture soundtrack to The Brown Bunny was released exclusively in Japan. The first five tracks come from artists Gordon Lightfoot, Jackson C. Frank, Matisse/Accardo Quartet, Jeff Alexander and Ted Curson. The last five tracks are performed by John Frusciante.

Soundtrack re-release
Australian indie label Twelve Suns re-issued The Brown Bunny soundtrack on deluxe gatefold vinyl on April 26, 2014. This reissue was fully authorized by Vincent Gallo and remastered from his master recordings. The re-issue was limited to 1000 copies. The first 5 tracks are from the film The Brown Bunny. The last 5 tracks were written before the movie and used as inspiration during filming.

See also
 2003 Cannes Film Festival
 Art house films
 Independent films
 List of American films of 2004

References

External links

 
 
 
 
 
 "Playboy Bunny: Vincent Gallo proves he just wants to be loved", David Edelstein, Slate.com, September 10, 2004.
 The Brown Bunny, Charles Taylor, Salon.com, September 17, 2004.
  Brows Held High episode about Gallo's film

2003 films
2000s avant-garde and experimental films
2000s erotic drama films
2000s drama road movies
American erotic drama films
American auto racing films
American independent films
American nonlinear narrative films
American drama road movies
2000s English-language films
Fellatio
Films about depression
Films about grieving
Films directed by Vincent Gallo
Films shot in the Las Vegas Valley
Films shot in Los Angeles
Films shot in Massachusetts
Films shot in Missouri
Films shot in New Hampshire
Films shot in Salt Lake City
Films shot in Utah
French auto racing films
French erotic drama films
Japanese auto racing films
Japanese erotic drama films
English-language Japanese films
Japanese nonlinear narrative films
Motorcycle racing films
Motorcycling films
Advertising and marketing controversies in film
Obscenity controversies in film
Films about self-harm
2003 drama films
2003 independent films
2000s American films
2000s Japanese films
2000s French films